Georgi Georgiev (born 11 August 1970) is a former Bulgarian-born Uzbekistani footballer who played as a forward.

Career
Born in Bulgaria, Georgiev was one of several foreign-born players to represent the Uzbekistan national football team in 2002 FIFA World Cup qualifying. He scored on his debut, a 7–0 victory against Taiwan on 23 April 2001.

International goal
Scores and results list Uzbekistan's goal tally first.

References

External links

 Profile at LevskiSofia.info

1970 births
Living people
Uzbekistani footballers
Uzbekistan international footballers
Bulgarian footballers
Bulgarian people of Uzbekistani descent
First Professional Football League (Bulgaria) players
Second Professional Football League (Bulgaria) players
OFC Pirin Blagoevgrad players
FC Chernomorets Burgas players
PFC Minyor Pernik players
PFC Levski Sofia players
PFC Slavia Sofia players
PFC Spartak Pleven players
Apollon Smyrnis F.C. players
Panserraikos F.C. players
PFC Vidima-Rakovski Sevlievo players
Vyzas F.C. players
PFC Kaliakra Kavarna players
PFC Lokomotiv Mezdra players
Association football forwards
Sportspeople from Blagoevgrad